USS Greyhound has been the name of more than one United States Navy ship, and may refer to:

, a schooner purchased in 1822 and sold in 1824
, a patrol boat in commission from 1917 to 1919
 a commercial steamer launched in 1906 which was in commission as the troop transport USS Yale (ID-1672) from 1918 to 1919 and as the troop transport USS Greyhound (IX-106) from 1943 to 1944

See also
 Greyhound (disambiguation)

United States Navy ship names